The Kwaio language, or Koio, is spoken in the centre of Malaita Island in the Solomon Islands. It is spoken by about 13,000 people.

Phonology 
The phonology of the Kwaio language includes 5 vowels and 18 consonants (including the glottal stop), which are shown below.

The labialised velars (gw, kw, and ŋw) only occur when preceding vowels a, e, and i. The phoneme /l/ is pronounced [l] when preceding low vowels (a, o, and e) but [r] when preceding high vowels (i, and u). For example, lu'u is pronounced "ru'u".

Syllables 
In the Kwaio language the bases are usually formed using stings of CVCV, but CVV, VCV, and VV appear because the consonants are sometimes dropped. There are no consonant clusters (CC), and all syllables are open, so they end in a vowel.

Stress 
When the same vowel appears twice in a row (in the form CVV or VV), the vowels act as separate syllables. Within morphemes, the stress is typically placed on the second-to-last vowel. When suffixes are attached to bases, the stress shifts to the second-to-last vowel according to this rule.  One exception is when a verb is in the form CVV and a monosyllabic pronoun is attached to it as a suffix, in which case the stress does not move. For example, the verb fai 'scratch' is stressed on the [a], but in the suffixed form fai-a 'scratch it' the stress remains with the first [a] and does not move to the [i].

Reduplication 
In Kwaio, full and partial reduplication commonly occurs. It happens when showing the passage of time; to emphasize the meaning of an adjective (siisika 'very small'); to show continuous, prolonged, or repeated action in verbs (bonobono 'completely closed'); or to indicate plurality in nouns (rua niinimana 'two arms').

Glottal stop deletion 
The glottal stop is often omitted in the Kwaio language when there are successive syllables that use the glottal stop. This happens across the word boundary if one word ends in -V'V and the next starts 'V-, which will then be pronounced as VV'V (instead of V'V'V), i.e. one of the glottal stops is dropped. An example of this is te'e + 'ola → tee'ola.

Morphology 
Similar to other Melanesian languages, Kwaio uses two morphological classes: bases and particles.  More complex forms can be made by modifying bases by adding affixes (prefixes, suffixes, or infixes) or by conjoining bases. Particles attach to bases and show the relationship between phrases and clauses. The bases follow the syllable pattern CVCV, CVV or VCV.

Possessive Nouns 
Similar to other languages on Malaita, the Kwaio language does not show possession of food and drinks, but it adds the possessive particle a-, e.g. 'ifi a-gu 'my house'. To show alienable possession, Kwaio uses fue nua which translates to 'my namesake'. Nouns are not strictly alienable or inalienable, instead the possession forms a semantic relationship between nouns. Possession must be looked at with a wider scope to establish where the possession belongs as nouns may be possessed differently using markers.

Individual and Mass Nouns 
If an inanimate noun is countable, it can be quantified by either a number or ni, which is a plural article. For example, in ni 'ai 'trees' the noun 'ai 'tree' is marked by the plural article. ni or numerals cannot be used when a noun is uncountable or a mass object.  For example, one 'sand' refers to a mass substance, so *ni one is ungrammatical. Yet, certain mass nouns can be quantified with an additional measure word, e.g. in oru foo'i one 'three grains of sand' the measure word foo'i 'grains' is used to quantify one 'sand'.

Pronouns 
There are 15 personal pronouns in Kwaio, covering four number categories (singular, dual, trial, and plural) and four persons (first inclusive, first exclusive, second and third). The language also distinguishes focal and referencing pronoun. The pronouns are shown in the table below. The vowels in parentheses are optional vowel lengthening.

Verbs 
Verbs in Kwaio fall into two categories: active verbs, which describe actions, and stative verbs, which describe states. Active verbs can be broken up into two more categories, namely transitive and intransitive verbs. The verbs can generally be distinguished by the relationship with noun phrases that are in the sentence or clause.

Syntax 
Sentences in Kwaio either have verbal predicates or do not. If a sentence has a verbal predicate, a comprising declarative, or is an interrogative sentence, it follows an SVO word order. Phrases in Kwaio include noun phrases, verb phrases, prepositional phrases, and temporal phrases. Sentences that do not have a verbal predicate include sentences that are equational and locative. Types of sentences include declarative verbal sentences, stative verbal sentences, and verbless declarative sentences. Questions have no special morphological marking but are indicated with intonation contours.  The passage of time can be represented with reduplication and repetition, as in eeleka leeleka leeleka ma la age no'o i mae-na 'He ran away into the forest and [after a long while] they gave the feast for his death', where the verb leka 'go' is reduplicated and repeated.

References

Malaita languages
Languages of the Solomon Islands
Kwaio